Khaled Mahmoudi (Arabic:خالد محمودي) (born 22 March 1993) is a Qatari footballer. He currently plays for Qatar SC.

External links

References

Qatari footballers
1993 births
Living people
Qatar SC players
Qatar Stars League players
Qatari Second Division players
Association football wingers
Association football fullbacks